George Hope (born 4 March 1954 in Haltwhistle, Northumberland, England), is an English footballer who played as a forward in the Football League.

References

External links
George Hope's Career

1954 births
Living people
English footballers
People from Haltwhistle
Footballers from Northumberland
Association football forwards
Charlton Athletic F.C. players
Newcastle United F.C. players
York City F.C. players
English Football League players

Went on to be a car sales man in York at SG Petch for approximately 13 years and retired in October 2019 and grew a beard.